Admiral Sir Hugh Henry Darby Tothill,  (14 March 1865 – 25 September 1927) was a Royal Navy officer who served as captain in World War I and went on to become commander-in-chief of East Indies Station following his promotion to admiral.

Naval career
Tothill was promoted to lieutenant in 1888, commander on 31 December 1900, and subsequently to captain in 1906. He was in command of the training brig HMS Nautilus from 20 January 1898 until 31 December 1900. In March 1900 he re-commissioned the brig at Devonport with a complement of boys for the annual training cruise. After promotion to commander, he was in January 1901 posted to the armoured cruiser HMS Australia, serving in home waters.

He was appointed Fourth Sea Lord in 1917 and served as Commander-in-chief at East Indies Station from 1919 to 1921 before becoming Admiral Commanding the Reserves in 1923. He retired from military service in 1926 and died in 1927.

References

External links
 Hugh Henry Darby Tothill at The Dreadnought Project

|-

1865 births
1927 deaths
Royal Navy admirals of World War I
Knights Commander of the Order of the Bath
Knights Commander of the Order of St Michael and St George
Knights Commander of the Royal Victorian Order
Lords of the Admiralty